The award system of Denmark, and especially the regulations for who is allowed to wear which medals, is one of great variation. The current honour-system has been created one step at a time since the 16th century. The system consists of royal orders and medals, official/governmental medals and some few private medals that have been approved by the monarch.



Orders of chivalry

Order of the Elephant

Order of the Dannebrog

Medals

Civil medals

Uniformed Service decorations

Commemorative medals

Historic

Historic Orders 
  Order of the Armed Arm 1616
  Order of the Perfect Union 1732 – 1770
  Order of Mathilde 1771 – 1772
  Order of Christian VII 1774 – 1800

Historic Medals 
  King Christian X's Liberty Medal (1946)
  Royal Life Guards 350th anniversary commemorative medal (2008)
  Guard Hussar Regiment 400th anniversary commemorative medal (2014)

See also 
 List of honours of Denmark awarded to heads of state and royalty

References

External links

 Orders and Medals Society of Denmark
 Danish Ribbons and medals

 
Denmark